Elvis Fisher (born October 25, 1988) is an American football offensive tackle who is currently a free agent. He played college football for the University of Missouri from 2007 to 2012. He is the son of Jeff "Jeffy" Fisher from the Glenn Beck Program.

Early years
Fisher graduated from St. Petersburg Catholic High School in Florida in 2007.

College career

University of Missouri
Fisher redshirted the 2007 season before starting all fourteen games at left tackle in 2008; his play earned him a spot on the First-team Freshman All-American Team. In 2009 and 2010, Fisher started all thirteen games at left tackle, bringing his total number of collegiate starts to 40. During the preseason in 2011, Fisher suffered a ruptured patellar tendon in his left knee and missed the entire season. He was awarded a medical hardship and returned to the team in 2012.

Professional career

New England Patriots
On May 3, 2013, he was signed as an undrafted free agent by the New England Patriots. On August 3, 2013, Fisher was released by the New England Patriots.

References

External links
Missouri Tigers bio

1988 births
Living people
American football offensive linemen
Missouri Tigers football players
New England Patriots players